Toot & Puddle is an animated children's television series based on the book series of the same name by author Holly Hobbie. Produced by Mercury Filmworks in association with National Geographic Kids, the series aired on Treehouse TV in Canada and Noggin in the United States. The last episode aired on May 15, 2011.  Reruns continue to air from September 28, 2009 until February 5, 2010. On November 5, 2008, even 11 days before the show’s official premiere on Noggin, Nickelodeon aired a sneak-peek preview as part of the “Noggin on Nick Jr.” block. 26 episodes were produced.

Plot
The series focuses on the lives of two adventurous pigs, Toot and Puddle. The two live in Woodcock Pocket with Puddle's cousin Opal and their parrot friend Tulip. In each episode, the duo learns about a different place or culture. During the course of each episode, either Toot visits a new location and communicates to Puddle by sending a postcard, or the two travel together. A song called The Boomerang Song plays before the second episode starts.

Characters 

Toot (voiced by Joanne Vannicola) is a young pig who loves to explore. He's almost always somewhere other than his home with his digital camera to capture photographs of his adventures. He's Puddle's best friend.
Puddle (voiced by Samantha Reynolds) is a pig. He likes to explore but finds the area where he lives more interesting than places far away. He's Toot's best friend.
Opal (voiced by Taylor Barber) is a cheerful and happy-go-lucky pig and Puddle's cousin who asks many questions.
Tulip (voiced by Linda Ballantyne) is a parrot who lives with the trio in Woodcock Pocket.
Otto (voiced by John McGrath) is a tortoise who lives with the forest in a tortoise like house.
Desmond (voiced by Andrew Sabiston) is a kangaroo from Australia.
Lilly (voiced by Bryn McAuley) is a frog who lives in Pocket Pond.
Dr. Ha Song (voiced by Denis Akiyama) is a Chinese pig who lives with the clinic in the hospital.

Episodes
The series ran for one season of 26 episodes.

 The Great Cheese Chase/Swing Shift – Toot & Puddle fly to France to get cheese, Puddle makes a swing using a tire, but the tire goes missing!
 Free-Falling Friends/Curried Favors - Toot & Puddle are given skydiving lessons, Toot flies to India and learns how to cool off.
 Opal's Big Move/Get With the Beat - Toot takes Opal to meet a famous ballerina he met in Russia, Toot flies to Democratic Republic of the Congo to learn about tribal culture.
 You Reap What You Sow/Lost and Found - Puddle teaches Opal how to plant a garden, Toot & Puddle fly to Belize to discover an ancient temple.
 Doors, Drawers, and Floors/Abominable Toot - Puddle teaches Toot to share, Toot & Puddle go to Tibet in the Himalayas to see if the Abominable Snowman is real.
 The Dragon Kite/Tulips for Tulip - Puddle and Opal go kite flying but their kite flies away, Toot & Puddle fly to the Netherlands to find tulips for Tulip.
 The Scarecrow/Which Way's Which? - Opal and Puddle can't decide what to wear to Otto's costume party, Toot flies to Denmark and helps a goose find her glasses.
 Toot & Puddle's Campout/Toot's Alpine Adventure - Toot & Puddle go camping, Toot flies to Germany to discover a castle and meets a lost calf.
 Party Pride/The Race - Toot & Puddle throws a house party for their friends while it's raining, Toot & Puddle fly to Balearic Islands, Spain and enters in a soapbox race.
 Puddle's Poison Ivy/The Amazing Maze - Puddle gets poison ivy which postpones Toot's trip to Egypt, Toot & Puddle fly to Ireland to explore its many hedge mazes.
 Year of the Pig/Robinson Toot - Dr. Ha Song misses spending Chinese New Year back home in China so Toot, Puddle and the rest of the gang brings it to him, Toot flies to Palau and goes on an island to get warm after a cold day in Woodcock Pocket.
 Night Lights/Away From Home - Puddle tries to figure out what to give Lilly at her party, Toot & Puddle fly to Japan but Puddle later gets homesick.
 Desmond Bounds In/Putting the Art in Artichoke - A kangaroo from Australia named Desmond moves to the neighborhood, Toot & Puddle fly to Castroville, California, USA to learn about its traditional and culinary arts.
 Bye-Bye, Butterfly/Flying Down to Rio - Opal finds a butterfly and learns about migration, Toot & Puddle fly to Brazil to think of an idea for Carnival.
 Otto's Blackout/Puddle's Delicious Waffles - Otto conquers his fear of the dark when a storm hits, Toot & Puddle fly to Belgium to learn how to make waffles.
 Recycle Cycle/Being Green - Toot, Puddle, and Opal learn to take care of their environment, Toot & Puddle fly to Scotland to help Toot's uncle Bertie reuse his old junk into something else.
 Desmond's First Snow/Haleakala Sunrise - The gang teaches Desmond what winter is like in Pocket Hollow, Toot & Puddle fly to Hawaii to learn how to dance the Hula at sunrise.
 Leap Frog/A Painted Pot - Lilly trains herself to jump high in the long jump, Toot & Puddle fly to Italy to learn how to play Football and paint pots.
 It's Mine/Tumble Pandas - Lilly finds a wild berry bush and is reluctant to share it, Toot flies to China and meets a group of acrobatic Pandas.
 Toot & Puddle's Clubhouse/Toot's Arctic Adventure - Toot & Puddle start their own secret club, Toot flies to Nunavut, Canada to learn about the eskimo tribe.
 The Show Must Go On/Astronaut Camp - The gang puts on a play, Toot & Puddle fly to Cape Canaveral, Florida, USA to join astronaut camp.
 Old and New/The Drawing Diary - Toot & Puddle wonders if they should get rid of their globe that covers every place that they visited, Toot goes to the Galapagos.  
 The Legend of Pocket Hollow/It's A Mystery - Toot & Puddle get spooked by a story of a monster in Pocket Hollow, Toot & Puddle fly to England to solve any mystery that comes to mind.
 Opal's Loose Tooth/Take a Break - Opal worries about her loose tooth, Toot & Puddle fly to Niger and learns about digging for fossils. 
 Puddle's Lucky Clover/Friends in the City - Puddle loses his good luck charm, Toot & Puddle fly to New York City, USA.
 Look Again/Round Round Get Around - Toot, Puddle and their friends goes on a treasure hunt, Toot & Puddle goes to Vancouver, British Columbia, Canada to give their friend a birthday present.

References

External links
 TV.com | Toot & Puddle

2000s American animated television series
2008 American television series debuts
2009 American television series endings
2000s Canadian animated television series
2008 Canadian television series debuts
2009 Canadian television series endings
Animated television series about brothers
Animated television series about children
Animated television series about pigs
Animated television series about birds
Animated television series about turtles
Animated television series about frogs
Nick Jr. original programming
American children's animated adventure television series
American children's animated fantasy television series
American preschool education television series
American television series based on children's books
Canadian children's animated adventure television series
Canadian children's animated fantasy television series
Canadian preschool education television series
Canadian television shows based on children's books
Animated preschool education television series
2000s preschool education television series
English-language television shows
Treehouse TV original programming